Yangpyeong Station is a train station on the Gyeongui-Jungang Line the commuter rail service of the Seoul Metropolitan Subway system, in South Korea. Its name duplicates with Yangpyeong Station in Seoul Subway Line 5, so the two stations can be confused with each other.

External links
 Station information from Korail

References 

Seoul Metropolitan Subway stations
Railway stations opened in 1939
Metro stations in Yangpyeong County
Railway stations in Gyeonggi Province